Jasper Independent School District is a public school district based in Jasper, Texas. Jasper ISD serves the city of Jasper.

In 2009, the school district was rated "recognized" by the Texas Education Agency.

Effective the 2022-2023 school year the district will hold classes four days per week instead of five.

Schools
Secondary schools
 Jasper High School (grades 9-12)
 Jasper Junior High School (grades 6-8)

Primary schools
 Parnell Elementary School (grades 4-5)
 Jean C. Few Primary School (prekindergarten through grade 3)

Former schools
 Rowe High School (A segregated all-African-American school)

References

External links
 Jasper Independent School District

School districts in Jasper County, Texas